"Give Me the Meltdown" is a song released from Rob Thomas' second album, Cradlesong.

It was released to the iTunes Store on June 9, 2009. The song was released as the second single, though exclusively to the Australian market where it peaked at #41. In the United States it peaked at #6 on the Billboard Bubbling Under Hot 100 Singles with digital sales only.

Music video
A music video to "Give Me the Meltdown" was directed by the directing team Walter Robot and premiered on MySpace on July 8, 2009. It featured people melting down and wrecking everything in their office/home/etc, then being stopped by wizards, gorillas, spaceships and other out of place things. Thomas makes a cameo in the video.

Chart positions

Track listing
iTunes single
"Give Me the Meltdown" – 3:13

References

Rob Thomas (musician) songs
2009 singles
Song recordings produced by Matt Serletic
Songs written by Rob Thomas (musician)
2009 songs
Atlantic Records singles
Songs written by Matt Serletic